Nizhnyaya Yentala is a rural locality (a selo) in Yenangskoye Rural Settlement, Kichmengsko-Gorodetsky District, Vologda Oblast, Russia. The population was 33 as of 2002. There are 3 streets.

Geography 
Nizhnyaya Yentala is located 67 km east of Kichmengsky Gorodok (the district's administrative centre) by road. Alexeyevo is the nearest rural locality.

References 

Rural localities in Kichmengsko-Gorodetsky District